Arindam  is Sanskrit for the man who has won all his enemies. Hindu god Shiva and Krishna also have this name. Even Arjun of Mahabharata and Indrajit of Ramayana have the same name for their bravery and triumph over their enemy. 

In Eastern part of India, Arindam is a popular name among the Bengali and the Assamese folks.
In Bengali, it is pronounced as "Awe-Reen-Daum".

In Southern India God Subramanya is referred to as Arindama - Destroyer of enemies
Arinthamah Kumarascha Guhaskandho Mahabalaaha! is reference in Subramanya Trisathi.

Indian given names
Hindu given names
Sanskrit-language names